Don Andrea Gallo (18 July 1928 – 22 May 2013) was an Italian presbyter, founder and leader of the community of San Benedetto al Porto of Genoa.
He often called himself a "priest of the sidewalk", referring to his activity of helping poor and needy people.

Biography 
Andrea Gallo was drawn to as a child by spirituality of Salesians of John Bosco, and entered the 1948 in their novitiate of Varazze. In 1953, after studying philosophy in Rome, Gallo was asked to leave Italy for missions, and he was sent to São Paulo, Brazil, where he attended theology courses. Since the Brazilian dictatorship forced him to return to Italy, in 1954 he went to Ivrea to continue the studies and was ordained as a priest on 1 July 1959.

A year later he was sent as a chaplain to the training ship Garaventa, trying to introduce a different setting in teaching and to replace the repressive methods with an education based upon trust and freedom. After three years Gallo was moved to another position, and in 1964 he decided to leave the Salesians and asked his superiors to incardinate in the Archdiocese of Genoa. After that, the Cardinal Giuseppe Siri, archbishop of Genoa at that time, sent him to Capraia, as the chaplain of the prison.

Two months later he was assigned as assistant pastor to the parish of Mount Carmel, where he remained until 1970, when Cardinal Siri moved back to Capraia. In the parish of Mount Carmel Andrea Gallo started to gather young people and adults from all over the city, especially the poor and the marginalized. In the summer of 1970, after a den of hashish was discovered in the same district, Gallo, taking a cue from the fact, he recalled in his homily that there are many other drugs, for example those of language, thanks to which a boy may become "unsuitable for studies" "if he is the son of poor people, or a bombing of helpless people can become action in defense of freedom." He was accused of being a communist, and this led the curia to decide his removal. The measure of the archbishop caused the parish and the town to protest, but the curia did not turn back and ordered Don Gallo to obey. However, he refused the assignment to Capraia, believing that there he would be totally and permanently isolated. Some time later he was welcomed by the parish priest of St. Benedict at Port of Genoa, Don Federico Rebora, and together with a small group he established the Comunità di San Benedetto al Porto.

Since then he has committed to pacifism and to the recovery of marginalized people, even advocating for the legalization of soft drugs: in 2006 Gallo was fined for smoking marijuana in the town hall of Genoa to protest against the law on drugs in Italy. He actively supported the movement No Dal Molin of Vicenza against the construction of a new U.S. military base in Padua. In April 2008 Gallo joined the V2-Day organized by Beppe Grillo. On 27 June 2009 he participated to the Genova Pride 2009, complaining about the uncertainties of the Catholic Church in respect of homosexuality.

An LGBT rights advocate, on 15 August 2011 Gallo was honored as Gay Character of the Year by Gay.it  in Torre del Lago. In 2013 he said that the Catholic Church needs an openly gay pope.

He died in Genoa on 22 May 2013 at the age of 84. His death was announced by Domenico Chionetti, spokesman for the Community of San Benedetto al Porto.

Works
 
 
 
 
  Reprinted in Milan by Dalai publishers in 2011

See also

Notes

External links

Don Gallo interviewed by the Italian Rolling Stone Magazine

1928 births
20th-century Italian Roman Catholic priests
2013 deaths
Clergy from Genoa
Italian communists
Catholic socialists
Christian communists
21st-century Italian Roman Catholic priests
Italian anarchists
Christian anarchists